Erik Arne Björk (22 December 1911 – 5 February 1996) was a Swedish dentist famous for his The Face in Profile Analysis which he published in 1947. He is also known to develop the implant radiography.

Education
Björk was born in Ludvika, Sweden. He received his dental training in Stockholm. He practiced dentistry from 1937 to 1951. He served as chairman of orthodontics in Malmö, Sweden from 1940–1950. He then served as Professor of Orthodontics in Royal Dental College, Denmark. During his studying, he published his thesis called "Face in the Profile" which made him famous in the orthodontic circles. Eventually he became the head of Department of Orthodontics and head of Craniofacial Growth Center at the Royal Dental College for next 30 years. He was nominated as member of World Federation of Orthodontists in 1995.

Implant Radiography
Björk was one of the first people to work on Implant Radiography. He, along with his coworkers, placed metal pins in bones of jaws and other parts of skeleton. They then looked at these pins in a Cephalometric Analysis to assess the growth pattern of a growing individual. This technique was instrumental in providing a way to study the grown pattern of a human mandible. Previously to his work, the information about how rotation of jaws playing role in growth of maxilla and mandible was under-appreciated. Björk, through his research, defined concepts of Forward Rotation and Backward Rotation of jaws. He defined Forward Rotation of jaw where the posterior growth of maxilla and mandible is greater than the anterior and Backward Rotation as where the anterior growth of jaws is greater than the posterior areas.

Björk also developed seven structural signs that helped find the direction of the growth of mandible, also known as Bjork Analysis.
 Inclination of Condylar Head
 Curvature of Mandibular Canal
 Shape of Lower border of Mandible
 Inclination of Symphysis
 Interincisal Angle
 Intermolar or Interpremolar Angles
 Lower Anterior Facial Height

Awards and recognitions
 Honorary member of World Federations of Orthodontists 
 Albert Ketcham Memorial Award - 1973
 Chairman of Orthodontic Department at Malmo, Sweden 1949-1950
 Orthodontic Professor at Royal Dental College 1951-1981
 Sheldon Friel Memorial Lecture - 1980

References

Swedish dentists
Orthodontists
1911 births
1996 deaths
20th-century dentists